The 1935–36 NWHL season was the third and final season of the North West Hockey League, a minor professional ice hockey league in the Northwestern United States and Canada. Five teams participated in the league, and the Seattle Seahawks won the championship.

Regular season

Playoffs

Semi-final
Best of 3

Vancouver Lions beat Portland Buckaroos 2 wins to 1.

Final
Best of 5

Seattle Seahawks beat Vancouver Lions 3 wins to 1.

External links
Season on hockeydb.com

1935 in ice hockey
1936 in ice hockey